Ayoub Abou Oulam (born 28 June 1998) is a Moroccan footballer who plays as a midfielder for Italian  club SPAL.

Career
Abou was born in Casablanca but moved to Barcelona at the age of nine. He subsequently joined FC Barcelona's La Masia, but moved to FC Porto in July 2015, being initially assigned to the under-20 squad.

On 30 August 2017, Abou joined Segunda División B side CF Rayo Majadahonda. He made his senior debut on 10 September, starting in a 0–4 away loss against SD Ponferradina.

Abou scored his first senior goal on 15 October 2017, netting the second in a 2–0 home win against Pontevedra CF. He finished the campaign with two goals in 31 matches, as his side achieved a first-ever promotion to Segunda División.

In 2018, Abou signed for Spanish third tier club Real Madrid Castilla. In 2021, Abou signed for SPAL in the Italian second tier. Before the second half of 2021–22, he was sent on loan to Bulgarian team Tsarsko Selo. On 20 February 2022, he made his debut in a 1–2 loss to Beroe.

References

External links

1998 births
Living people
Footballers from Casablanca
Spanish footballers
Moroccan footballers
Association football midfielders
Segunda División B players
CF Rayo Majadahonda players
Real Madrid Castilla footballers
S.P.A.L. players
First Professional Football League (Bulgaria) players
FC Tsarsko Selo Sofia players
Moroccan expatriate footballers
Moroccan expatriate sportspeople in Bulgaria
Moroccan expatriate sportspeople in Portugal
Moroccan expatriate sportspeople in Italy
Expatriate footballers in Bulgaria
Expatriate footballers in Portugal
Expatriate footballers in Italy